Bionic contact lenses are devices that, it is proposed by the manufacturers and developers, could provide a virtual display that could have a variety of uses from assisting the visually impaired to video gaming. The device will have the form of a conventional contact lens with added bionics technology in the form of a head-up display, with functional electronic circuits and infrared lights to create a virtual display allowing the viewer to see a computer-generated display superimposed on the world outside.

Proposed components
An antenna on the lens could pick up a radio frequency.

In 2016, work on Interscatter from the University of Washington has shown the first Wi-Fi enabled contact lens prototype that can communicate directly with mobile devices such as smart phones at data rates between 2–11Mbit/s.

Development
Development of the first contact lens display began in the 1990s.

Experimental versions of these devices have been demonstrated, such as one developed by Sandia National Laboratories. The lens is expected to have more electronics and capabilities on the areas where the eye does not see. Radio frequency power transmission and solar cells are expected in future developments. Recent work augmented the contact lens with Wi-Fi connectivity.

In 2011, a functioning prototype with a wireless antenna and a single-pixel display was developed.

Previous prototypes proved that it is possible to create a biologically safe electronic lens that does not obstruct a person’s view. Engineers have tested the finished lenses on rabbits for up to 20 minutes and the animals showed no problems.

See also
 Augmented reality
 Google Contact Lens
 Heads-Up Display
 Optical head-mounted display
 Smartglasses
 Visual prosthesis

External links
 RaayonNova
 SmartContactLens Inc

References

Contact lenses
Artificial organs
Emerging technologies
American inventions
Augmented reality
Bionics